Atlantica, formally known as Atlantica: the International Northeast Economic Region (AINER), is the name of a proposed area of economic integration in the Atlantic Northeast of North America, incorporating parts of Canada and the United States.

Organization
The trade zone is promoted by the Atlantic Institute for Market Studies in Halifax, Nova Scotia, with U.S. representatives in Bangor, Maine.

Atlantica has also been promoted by the Atlantic Growth Network, also based in Halifax, with the support of the Atlantic Canada Opportunities Agency, which sponsored a 2002 conference.

A conference on these issues was held at Saint John, New Brunswick June 8–10, 2006. Another conference was held in Halifax, Nova Scotia June 11–16, 2007.

This effort has also been supported by the Atlantic Provinces Chamber of Commerce and Vermont Economic Development. A trade and networking conference was held October 4–6, 2008, in Stowe, Vermont at Smugglers Notch resort as part of the RTC Congress Conference.

Regional justification
The boundaries defined by the Atlantic Institute for Market Studies broadly echo the Atlantic Northeast, incorporating Upstate New York roughly north of I-90 (or the Erie Canal), Vermont, New Hampshire, Maine, New Brunswick, Nova Scotia, Prince Edward Island, the island of Newfoundland, and Quebec on the south shore of the Saint Lawrence Seaway. The inclusion of Labrador, and thus the entirety of Newfoundland and Labrador, is unsettled. Some organization maps also include the region of Quebec directly south of Labrador, but this has not been elaborated on.

The proponents of Atlantica believe this region has common geography, demographics, economics, and environment. In particular, proponents believe that the region has seen declining political influence in both countries, and would do well to pool its resources. 

Supporters believe that state, provincial, and international borders, as well as tariffs and regulatory differences, disrupt the economic potential of the region, and that a common strategy would maximize the region's opportunities in the globalization era. The goal of the institute seems to be further reduction of tariff and regulatory barriers under NAFTA and development of cross-border infrastructure to facilitate shipping. The benefit to New England is access to the port of Halifax, while the benefit to the Atlantic provinces is direct overland access to U.S. markets.

Opposition
Opponents of the nascent Atlantica project see it having a neo-liberal agenda that would harm worker pay and rights, benefit corporations at the expense of consumers, and undermine social services through reduced taxation.  Protesters were seen at the June 2006 conference , and large-scale demonstrations occurred in Halifax, Nova Scotia from June 14–16 in opposition to the accord. One of these protests turned into a small scale riot, when the Black Bloc, which included perhaps 150 protesters, moved off the planned route and ran towards the business district of Spring Garden Road, likely planning to attack or demonstrate outside the many outlets of large corporations there. Police cars and buildings were pelted with rocks and water balloons filled with paint, but police quickly quelled most of the violence. Three people were seriously injured. Twenty protesters were arrested and were released on bail after the conference ended.

Additional protests have been held with concerns over the proposed privately funded $1 Billion super-highway planned to cut across New Brunswick and Maine with corridors into Vermont and northern New Hampshire.

See also 
 Cascadia
 Great Lakes Commission
 Atlantic Northeast
 New England French
 Northern New England Corridor
 Canadian Consulate-General, Boston

External links 
 Atlantica - official site
 Atlantic Institute for Market Studies - institute site
 Atlantica Growth Network - Greater Halifax Partnership
 Reaching Atlantica - site for 2006 conference
 Stop Atlantica - protest site

Canada–United States relations
Trade blocs
New England
Economy of Nova Scotia
Economy of New Brunswick
Economy of Prince Edward Island
Economy of Newfoundland and Labrador
Economy of Vermont
Economy of New York (state)
Economy of Maine
Economy of Quebec
Geographical neologisms